The Vomperbach is a river of Tyrol, Austria, a tributary of the Inn.

The Vomperbach rises in the Karwendel mountain range, close to the source of the Isar and flows first from west to east.

Water quality
In its upper course in the Vomper Loch, the river is partly covered by detrital, therefore almost invisible and a water quality cannot be measured. Below until its mouth the water quality remains constantly grade A and provides the villages with drinking water.

References

Rivers of Tyrol (state)
Rivers of Austria